Frederick Anthony Picariello, Jr. (born December 4, 1936), better known by his stage name Freddy Cannon, is an American rock and roll singer, whose biggest international hits included "Tallahassee Lassie", "Way Down Yonder in New Orleans", and "Palisades Park".

Biography
Freddy Picariello was born in Revere, Massachusetts, moving to the neighboring city of Lynn as a child. His father worked as a truck driver and also played trumpet and sang in local bands. Freddy grew up listening to the rhythm and blues music of Big Joe Turner, Buddy Johnson and others on the radio, and he learned to play guitar.  After attending Lynn Vocation High School, he made his recording debut as a singer in 1958, singing and playing rhythm guitar on a single, "Cha-Cha-Do" by the Spindrifts, which became a local hit.  He had also played lead guitar on a session for an R&B vocal group, the G-Clefs, whose record "Ka-Ding Dong" made No. 24 on the Billboard Hot 100 in 1956. At a young age he joined the National Guard, took a job driving a truck, married, and became a father.

Inspired musically by Chuck Berry, Bo Diddley and Little Richard, he formed his own group, Freddy Karmon & the Hurricanes, which became increasingly popular in the Boston area, and began to develop a trademark strained singing style.  He also became a regular on a local TV dance show, Boston Ballroom, and, in 1958, signed up to a management contract with Boston disc jockey Jack McDermott.  With lyrics written by his mother, he prepared a new song which he called "Rock and Roll Baby", and he produced a demo which McDermott took to the writing and production team of Bob Crewe and Frank Slay.  They rearranged the song, rewrote the lyrics, and offered to produce a recording in return for two-thirds of the composing credits. The first recording of the song, now titled "Tallahassee Lassie", with a guitar solo by session musician Kenny Paulson, was rejected by several record companies, but was then heard by TV presenter Dick Clark who part-owned Swan Records in Philadelphia. 

Clark suggested that the song be re-edited and overdubbed to add excitement, by highlighting the pounding bass drum sound and adding hand claps and Freddy's cries of "whoo!", which later became one of his trademarks. The single was finally released by Swan Records, with the company president, Bernie Binnick, suggesting Freddy's new stage name of "Freddy Cannon". After being promoted and becoming successful in Boston and Philadelphia, the single gradually received national airplay.  In 1959, it peaked at No. 6 on the Billboard Hot 100, becoming the first of his 22 songs to appear on the Billboard chart, and also reached No. 13 on the R&B singles chart. In the UK, where his early records were issued on the Top Rank label, it reached No. 17. "Tallahassee Lassie" sold over one million copies and was awarded a gold disc by the RIAA.

He stayed on the Swan label with producer Frank Slay for the next five years and became known as Freddy "Boom Boom" Cannon for the thumping power of his recordings. Dick Clark brought him national exposure through his numerous appearances on his television program, American Bandstand - a record of 110 appearances in total.  In the words of writer Cub Koda:"Freddy Cannon was a true believer, a rocker to the bone. Freddy Cannon made rock & roll records; great noisy rock & roll records, and all of them were infused with a gigantic drum beat that was an automatic invitation to shake it on down anyplace there was a spot to dance."

His second single "Okefenokee" (credited to Freddie Cannon, as were several of his other records) only made No. 43 on the charts, but the next record, "Way Down Yonder In New Orleans", a rocked-up version of a 1922 song, became a gold record and reached No. 3 in the pop charts in both the US and the UK, where it was the biggest of his hits. It also sold over one million copies.  Cannon toured in Britain and, in March 1960, his album The Explosive Freddy Cannon became the first album by a rock and roll singer to top the UK Albums Chart. For the next two years, until early 1962, he continued to have lesser chart hits in the US, in some cases with versions of old standards including "Chattanoogie Shoe Shine Boy" and Edward "Kid" Ory's "Muskrat Ramble".  His hits also included "Twistin' All Night Long", recorded with Danny & the Juniors and also featuring Frankie Valli and the Four Seasons on backing vocals. However, one of his biggest hits came in May 1962 with "Palisades Park", written by future TV Gong Show host Chuck Barris. Produced by Slay with overdubbed rollercoaster sound effects, it reached No. 3 on the Hot 100, No. 15 on the R&B chart, and No. 20 in the UK. This release also sold over one million copies, gaining gold disc status.

Cannon also appeared with Bobby Vee, Johnny Tillotson and others, in the movie Just for Fun, made in the UK in 1962.  Although his popularity in the US faded, he remained a popular touring act in Britain and elsewhere in the world for some years.  In 1963, he signed for Warner Bros. Records where he recorded his last two US top twenty hits, "Abigail Beecher" (No. 16) in 1964 and the following year "Action" (No. 13), from Dick Clark's TV show Where the Action Is, which he recorded with top Los Angeles session musicians including Leon Russell, James Burton, Glen Campbell, and David Gates. "Action" got a fourth gold disc for Cannon. Also in 1965, Slay acquired Cannon's Swan recordings and sold them to Warner Bros.
He appeared, along with the Beau Brummels, in Village of the Giants, a teen movie with early film appearances by Beau Bridges and Ron Howard, and played himself, performing one of his songs, in the final episode of the teen soap opera, Never Too Young, on 24 June 1966. 
After leaving Warner Bros. Records in 1967, Cannon released singles on several labels, including Sire, Royal American, Metromedia, MCA, Andee, Claridge, Horn, and Amherst. In the 1970s he recorded and became a promotional man for Buddah Records, but returned to the lower reaches of the charts in 1981 with "Let's Put the Fun Back in Rock'n'Roll," recorded with the Belmonts for MiaSound Records and in 1982 appeared in the independent movie, The Junkman.  Thereafter, he continued to work with Dick Clark at his Bandstand reunion concerts and to tour all over the world.  In 2002, he released an album of seasonal songs, Have A Boom Boom Christmas!!

A resident of Tarzana, California, Cannon continues to put on performances at assorted concert venues. He has complete control and ownership of his Swan and Warner Bros. masters.

One notable fan of Cannon's was the late Box Tops and Big Star singer Alex Chilton; Chilton reportedly had a portrait of Cannon hanging on the wall of his home in New Orleans and had once offered the following comment about Cannon to a friend: "Freddy Cannon’s shows always worked, because he moved through life with ease."

Discography

Singles

Albums
The Explosive Freddy Cannon (1960, Swan LP 502 (Mono)/S 502 (Stereo)) - UK #1
Freddy Cannon Sings Happy Shades of Blue (1960, Swan LP 504)
Freddy Cannon's Solid Gold Hits (1961, Swan LP 505)
Palisades Park (1962, Swan LP 507)
Steps Out (1962, Swan LPS 511)
Bang On (1963, Stateside Records SL 10013) - European release of Palisades Park
The above five albums were issued in mono only
Freddie Cannon (1964, Warner Bros. W 1544 (Mono)/WS 1544 (Stereo))
Action (1965, Warner Bros. W 1612/WS 1612)
Freddy Cannon's Greatest Hits (1966, Warner Bros. W 1628/WS 1628) - Greatest hits from both Swan and Warner Bros. labels
14 Booming Hits (1982, Rhino RNDF 210)
His Latest & Greatest (1991, Critique)
The Best of Freddy "Boom Boom" Cannon (1995, Rhino)
Where The Action Is The Very Best 1964-1981 (2002, Varese Sarabande)
Have A Boom Boom Christmas!! (2002, Gotham)
The Best of Freddy Cannon (Collectibles, 2003)
Boom Boom Rock 'n' Roll: The Best Of Freddy Cannon (Shout! Factory, 2009)

See also
List of rock and roll performers
List of Italian American entertainers
List of acts who appeared on American Bandstand
List of guests appearing on The Midnight Special

References

External links
 Official website
 
 

1936 births
Living people
American male singers
American rock guitarists
American male guitarists
American rock singers
People from Revere, Massachusetts
People from Lynn, Massachusetts
Swan Records artists
Warner Records artists
20th-century American guitarists
20th-century American male musicians